Port Gawler is a locality and former port on Gulf St Vincent on the central Adelaide Plains in South Australia.

Port Gawler was named in 1867 and a government town surveyed around 1869, but was officially declared to have ceased to exist on 23 June 1960. The boundaries for the modern locality were created for the long established name in June 1997, incorporating both the former government town and the private subdivision of Milner.

Local government
The first local government body established in the area was the District Council of Mudla Wirra, proclaimed in 1854. Mudla Wirra council encompassed those parts of the Hundred of Port Gawler and Hundred of Grace south of the River Light as well as all of the Hundred of Mudla Wirra. This included Port Gawler itself. In 1856 those parts in the hundreds of Grace and Port Gawler seceded to form the District Council of Port Gawler. In 1935 Port Gawler council amalgamated with Dublin and Grace councils to form the District Council of Mallala (initially called District Council of Light, much later called Adelaide Plains Council).

See also
 Gawler River (South Australia)

References

Towns in South Australia
Gulf St Vincent